The 2018–19 Bradley Braves women's basketball team represents Bradley University during the 2018–19 NCAA Division I women's basketball season. The Braves were led by third year head coach Andrea Gorski. The Braves were members of the Missouri Valley Conference and play their home games at Renaissance Coliseum. They finished the season 20–10, 10–8 in MVC play to finish in fifth place. They lost in the quarterfinals of the Missouri Valley women's tournament to Illinois State. Despite having 20 wins and a better record, they were not invited to a postseason tournament.

Roster

Schedule

|-
!colspan=9 style=|  Exhibition

|-
!colspan=9 style=|  Non-conference regular season

|-
!colspan=9 style=| Missouri Valley Conference regular season

|-
!colspan=9 style=| Missouri Valley Women's Tournament

See also
2017–18 Bradley Braves men's basketball team

References

2017-18
2018–19 Missouri Valley Conference women's basketball season
2019 in sports in Illinois
2018 in sports in Illinois